Sunset Beach is a hamlet on Crooked Lake in the Canadian province of Saskatchewan.

Demographics 

References

Designated places in Saskatchewan
Grayson No. 184, Saskatchewan
Organized hamlets in Saskatchewan
Division No. 5, Saskatchewan